In Sikhism, Nām Japō 
(), also known as Naam Japna or Naam Simran, refers to the meditation or contemplation of the various Names of God (or qualities of God), especially the chanting of the word "Waheguru" ('Wonderful Teacher') representing the formless being, the creator of all the forms, and the being omnipresent in all forms. 

Less commonly, it is the vocal singing of hymns from the Guru Granth Sahib; the singing of hymns is generally also referred to as Nām Riramon Bunman. Singing of hymns with musical accompaniment is generally referred to as kirtan. While contemplating God's names a devotee is able to get nām, the divine connection with God. Nām Riramon Bunman is able to fulfill all desires and cleanse the mind of its impurities distress. Through nām, the devotees are able to harness Godly qualities and remove the five thieves.

Overview 
Nām Japna requires the remembrance of God or the Akal Purkh, the supreme formless power that is timeless and deathless, by repeating and focusing the mind on a single repetition of one of God's various names or qualities. A particular name or phase is administered to someone when they are initiated into the Sikh faith more often than not this is the Mul Mantar, which is repeated throughout the Guru Granth Sahib. Many other names are also found in Guru Gobind Singh's Jaap Sahib, which contains 950 names of God. The guideline in the Rehat Maryada of Guru Gobind Singh demands that the Sikh engage in Naam Simran as part of his or her daily routine.

Nām Japō is one of the three pillars of Sikhism, along with Kirat karō and Vaṇḍ chakkō. Critical importance is given to the meditation in the Guru Granth Sahib as the way in which humans can conquer ego, greed, attachment, anger and lust, together commonly called the Five Evils or Five Thieves and to bring peace and tranquility into one's mind. The Sikhs practice both the quiet individual recitation of Naam in one's mind, commonly called Naam Simran, and the loud and communal recitation of Naam, called Naam Jaap. However, this is not a strict definition of these phrases.

In the Guru Granth Sahib:

See also
 Japji Sahib
 Jaap Sahib
 Shabda
 Sikh philosophy
 Outline of Sikhism
 Meditation

References

Sikh terminology
Sikh practices
Chants
Meditation